= National Pledge of Papua New Guinea =

The National Pledge of Papua New Guinea (PNG Pledge) is often recited around Papua New Guinea throughout a range of government-based organisations. It is often recited at both primary schools and high schools before the commencement of classes each day; in the National Parliament on each sitting day immediately after prayers; in each Provincial Assembly and Local-level Government Assembly on each sitting day immediately after prayers and at all official celebrations on the day fixed under the Public Holidays Act 1953 to commemorate the attainment by Papua New Guinea of Independent Sovereign Nationhood.

== Pledge ==
We, the People of Papua New Guinea,
pledge ourselves, united in One Nation.
We pay homage to our cultural heritage,
the source of our strength.
We pledge to build a democratic society
based on justice, equality, respect and
prosperity for Our People.
We pledge to stand together as
– One People
– One Nation
– One Country

GOD BLESS PAPUA NEW GUINEA.
